Grotella dis is a moth in the genus Grotella, of the family Noctuidae. The species was first described by Augustus Radcliffe Grote in 1883. This moth species is found in North America, from the Argus mts. in Kansas to North Mexico.

Description
Head and thorax white; antennae ochreous; pectus, legs, and abdomen tinged with brown. Forewing pure white, the costal edge black towards base. Hindwing white suffused with fuscous: the cilia pure white. Underside of forewing suffused with fuscous; hindwing white, with curved postmedial line, the costal and terminal areas suffused with fuscous.

References

Grotella
Moths described in 1883